Belgium has competed at most editions of the Olympic Games after making its first appearance at the 1900 Games.  The nation was host to the 1920 Summer Olympics in Antwerp.

The National Olympic Committee for Belgium was created and recognized in 1906.

Hosted Games 
Belgium has hosted the Games on one occasion.

Medal tables

Medals by Summer Games

Medals by Winter Games

Medals by summer sport

Medals by winter sport

List of medalists

Summer Olympics 

 Russian team's gold medals were stripped due to anti-doping rules violation by Yulia Chermoshanskaya.

Winter Olympics

Summary by sport

Aquatics

Swimming

Belgium's Olympic debut included one swimmer, who entered the men's 4000 metre freestyle and did not finish the first round (semifinals).

Archery

Archery was one of the sports in which Belgium competed in the nation's first appearance in 1900. The Belgian archers took the gold medal in 3 of the 7 events in Paris, finishing with 7 medals total.

Cycling

Belgium's debut in 1900 included one cyclist.

Equestrian

Belgium competed at the first equestrian events in 1900, winning gold medals in three of the five events.

Fencing

Belgium's Olympic debut in 1900 included five fencers, one of whom reached the final pool but who won no medals.

Field hockey

Belgium's Olympic debut was in 1920 as the host nation. They won the bronze medal. Their best result was the gold medal in 2020.

Football

Belgium's Olympic debut in 1900 included a men's football team, which is currently recognized as bronze medalists. The team's next appearance was as the host of the 1920 Games, at which the Belgian men won gold. Belgium competed again at the next two Games (1924 and 1928), but then did not appear again until 2008. That year, Belgium reached the semifinals but then lost twice to finish fourth.

Belgium has not appeared at the Olympics in women's soccer.

Gymnastics

Belgium's Olympic debut in 1900 included two gymnasts who competed in the men's individual all-around.

Rowing

Belgium competed at the first Olympic rowing regatta in 1900; the Royal Club Nautique de Gand men's eight took silver.

Sailing

Shooting

Belgium debuted in shooting in 1900.

See also
 List of flag bearers for Belgium at the Olympics
 :Category:Olympic competitors for Belgium
 Belgium at the Paralympics

References

External links
 
 
 
 BOIC – Belgian Olympic and Interfederal Committee official website